There are at least two notable streets called Molesworth Street:

Molesworth Street, Dublin, Ireland
Molesworth Street, Wellington, New Zealand

There are also Molesworth Streets in the following places:
North Adelaide, Australia
Wellesley, Ontario, Canada
Lewisham, England
Rochdale, England
Wadebridge, England
New Plymouth, New Zealand
Cookstown, Northern Ireland